"Same Damn Life" is a song by South African rock band Seether. It was released on 16 September 2014 as the second single from their sixth studio album Isolate and Medicate. The song's main riff borrows heavily from Peggy March's 1963 hit "I Will Follow Him".

Charts

Weekly charts

Year-end charts

References

2014 songs
Seether songs
Songs written by Shaun Morgan
Songs written by Dale Stewart
Songs written by John Humphrey (drummer)
Song recordings produced by Brendan O'Brien (record producer)